Endri Çekiçi (born 23 November 1996) is an Albanian professional footballer who plays as a winger for Turkish club Konyaspor and the Albania national team.

Club career

Early career
Çekiçi started his career with his local club Pogradeci in 2008, where he made his professional debut on 16 February 2013 at the age of 16. He came on as a 56th-minute substitute for the goalscorer Vangjel Zguro in a home Kategoria e Parë fixture against Besëlidhja which ended in a 1–0 win for Pogradeci. He was in the starting formation for his next game a month later on 16 March in a 3–0 home win against Naftëtari, where he was subbed off for Kristi Laçka in the 58th minute. He scored his first professional goal on 4 May 2013 against Burreli, scoring in the 11th minute to put his side 2–0 up, but it wasn't enough as Burreli came from behind to win the match 3–2. In total he made six league appearances for the club during the 2012–13 season, scoring one goal in the process to help his side finish fifth in the league.

He joined Kategoria Superiore side Teuta in the summer of 2013 ahead of the club's Europa League qualifier against Moldovan side Dacia Chișinău. Çekiçi came on as an 81st-minute substitute in the home leg of the fixture which ended in a 3–1 win for Teuta.

Dinamo Zagreb
In February 2014, Dinamo Zagreb and Teuta reached an agreement for the transfer of Çekiçi for €60,000. He was assigned in the youth team after successfully passing a trial early on. He signed his first professional contract on 23 November 2014, his birthday; the contract would keep him at Maksimir Stadium until June 2019. Çekiçi stated that this was the best birthday present for him.

Çekiçi made his competitive Dinamo Zagreb debut on 11 February by entering in the last minutes of a 1–0 away win over Istra, in the first leg of 2014–15 Croatian Cup quarter-finals. He made his first league appearance later that month during the 1–1 draw at Osijek in the matchday 22. Çekiçi played his first match as a starter on 28 February in the home match against RNK Split, notably winning a penalty kick in the 16th minute which resulted in him getting injured and substituted. Following the examinations, it was reported that Çekiçi had injured achilles tendon that kept him sidelined for the next three months.

He returned on action on 2 May 2015 by playing the second half of the 5–1 away win over the same opponent which was enough for Dinamo Zagreb to clinch the 2014–15 Croatian First Football League title for the 10th consecutive time. He finished his first season in Croatia by making 4 league appearances, collecting 109 minutes, and one cup appearance.

During the 2015–16 season, on 22 September 2015, Çekiçi scored his maiden Dinamo Zagreb goals in the 7–1 victory over Oštrc Zlatar valid for the 2015–16 Croatian Football Cup. In the first part of the season, his time was even more limited, playing only 15 minutes.

Loan to Lokomotiva Zagreb
In January 2016, Çekiçi joined Lokomotiva Zagreb on a one-and-a-half year loan. He made his first appearance for his new club on 12 February by appearing as a substitute in the 2–0 away loss to Rijeka. He scored his first league goal on 13 March in the 3–2 away defeat against his parent club Dinamo Zagreb; he also gave an assist for the temporary 2–2 equaliser which earned him Fans' Player of the Week Award. He finished the second part of the 2015–16 season with three goals in eleven appearances.

Olimpija Ljubljana
In February 2019, Çekiçi signed a contract with Slovenian club Olimpija Ljubljana.

MKE Ankaragücü
On 5 October 2020, Çekiçi joined Turkish Süper Lig club Ankaragücü.

International career

Albania under-17
Çekiçi received his first Albania under-17 call-up by manager Džemal Mustedanagić for a friendly tournament developed in August 2012 in Romania.

He was called up in October 2011 to be part of the team in the qualifying rounds of the 2012 UEFA European Under-17 Championship. He debuted on 13 October by starting in the first match against Slovakia which finished 2–1 for Çekiçi's side. Çekiçi then played in the next two matches against Germany and Estonia as Albania clinched a spot for the elite round.

In the elite round, Çekiçi retained his spot in the starting lineup as Albania suffered defeats to Serbia and the Netherlands, and won in the third match against the Republic of Ireland, eventually getting eliminated with a third-place finish.

Çekiçi continued to be part of under-17 even in the qualifying rounds of the 2013 UEFA European Under-17 Championship. He appeared in all three matches as Albania finished in third position which confirmed elimination.

Albania under-19
Çekiçi was first approached to under-19 side by manager Foto Strakosha for the 2014 UEFA European Under-19 Championship qualifying round. He played his first match as a starter on 12 November 2013 versus Greece as Albania slumped into a 1–0 defeat. He also played in the remaining two matches as Albania finished Group 6 in the last position with two points.

Çekiçi then was part of the squad for the following European qualifying campaign, as he was called up by Altin Lala for the 2015 edition. He captained Albania in all three Group 7 matches as Albania once again finished last, losing to Denmark, Portugal and Wales.

Albania under-21
He was called up for the first time to the Albania under-21 squad by coach Skënder Gega for the friendly match against Romania U21 on 8 October 2014. In that match, he came on as a substitute in the second half as Albania lost 3–1.

Çekiçi received another call up by the newly appointed coach Redi Jupi for the 2017 UEFA European Under-21 Championship qualifying matches against Israel and Portugal in September 2015. He debuted against the former by coming on as a second-half substitute, netting a penalty kick in the 84th minute to rescue his side a 1–1 home draw. He then played as a starter in the remaining matches, collecting 608 minutes as Albania finished Group 4 in fourth place.

Çekiçi went on to be a member of the under-21 squad in the following qualification tournament under new coach Alban Bushi; he was called up for the friendly match against France U21 on 5 June 2017 and the 2019 UEFA European Under-21 Championship qualification opening match against Estonia U21 on 12 June 2017. In the opening match of the qualifiers against Estonia U21, Çekiçi started from the bench due to a small injury and was put in play in the 86th minute in place of Kristal Abazaj where the match finished in a goalless draw. He missed out the second match against Northern Ireland U21 on 31 August 2017 as he didn't travelled with the team to Northern Ireland due to visa issues.

Senior team
In September 2020, Çekiçi was included in the Albania senior team squad for the 2020–21 UEFA Nations League C matches against Belarus and Lithuania, but did not make any appearances. He eventually debuted on 14 October 2020 in the second match against Lithuania, replacing Qazim Laçi during the second half in a goalless draw.

Career statistics

Club

Honours

Club
Dinamo Zagreb
 Croatian First League: 2014–15
 Croatian Cup: 2014–15

Olimpija Ljubljana
Slovenian Cup: 2018–19

References

External links

1996 births
Living people
People from Pogradec
Albanian footballers
Association football wingers
Albania youth international footballers
Albania under-21 international footballers
Albania international footballers
KS Pogradeci players
KF Teuta Durrës players
GNK Dinamo Zagreb players
GNK Dinamo Zagreb II players
NK Lokomotiva Zagreb players
NK Olimpija Ljubljana (2005) players
MKE Ankaragücü footballers
Konyaspor footballers
Kategoria e Parë players
Croatian Football League players
First Football League (Croatia) players
Slovenian PrvaLiga players
Süper Lig players
Albanian expatriate footballers
Albanian expatriate sportspeople in Croatia
Expatriate footballers in Croatia
Albanian expatriate sportspeople in Slovenia
Expatriate footballers in Slovenia
Albanian expatriate sportspeople in Turkey
Expatriate footballers in Turkey